A.D. (Boss) Jones House is a historic home located at Duanesburg in Schenectady County, New York. It was built about 1860 by noted master carpenter Alexander Delos "Boss" Jones.  It is a two-story, five bay frame farmhouse in a late-Greek Revival style with Italianate features. It features innovative stacked plank construction, a hipped roof, a wide frieze, and broad corner pilasters.  Also on the property are two contributing barns and a shed.

The property was covered in a study of Boss Jones TR

It was listed on the National Register of Historic Places in 1984.

References

Houses on the National Register of Historic Places in New York (state)
Greek Revival houses in New York (state)
Italianate architecture in New York (state)
Houses completed in 1860
Houses in Schenectady County, New York
National Register of Historic Places in Schenectady County, New York